Makhmutovo (Mäxmüt) is a rural locality (a village) in Arkaulovsky Selsoviet, Salavatsky District, Bashkortostan, Russia. The population was 100 as of 2010. There are 2 streets.

Geography 
Makhmutovo is located 38 km northwest of Maloyaz (the district's administrative centre) by road. Arkaulovo is the nearest rural locality.

References 

Rural localities in Salavatsky District